The New York City Marathon, one of the six World Marathon Majors, is a  race which has been held in New York City since 1970. It is the largest marathon in the world; since 2013, every race except one has had over 50,000 finishers. From 1970 through 1975, the race was held entirely in Central Park, but since 1976, the course has started in Staten Island and goes through each of the city's five boroughs. The race was canceled in 2012 due to Hurricane Sandy, which hit New York less than a week before the race had been scheduled to take place. The race was also cancelled in 2020 due to the COVID-19 pandemic in the city. In total, 35 men and 30 women have won the open division of the New York City Marathon, while nine men and seven women have won the wheelchair division. The winners have represented 22 different countries: Americans have won the marathon the most, doing so on 32 occasions; Kenyans have won 26 times; and Norwegians 10 times.

Gary Muhrcke won the first race in a time of 2:31:38. There were 127 entrants, of whom 55 finished – the only female starter, Nina Kuscsik, withdrew partway due to illness. The following year, Beth Bonner became the first female finisher, winning the race in 2:55:22: a time that is officially credited as the first sub-3-hour marathon by a woman. Grete Waitz, a Norwegian female runner, achieved three official world records at the race between 1978 and 1980. Allison Roe and Alberto Salazar set world record times in the women's and men's races in 1981, but a later investigation found that the course was short, and their times do not stand as official world records, though the New York City Marathon maintains them as course records. Waitz dominated the women's marathon between 1978 and 1989, winning nine of the eleven races during that period: her nine wins are the most of any runner at the New York City Marathon. In the men's race, Bill Rodgers has won the most times, doing so in four consecutive years, from 1976 to 1979. The current course records are held by Geoffrey Mutai, who set a time of 2:05:06 in the 2011 men's race, and Margaret Okayo, who set the women's record at 2:22:31 in 2003.

A wheelchair race has been held since 2000, when 72 people finished: Kamel Ayari won the men's race, and Anh Nguyen Thi Xuan won the women's. Among the wheelchair racers, Edith Hunkeler of Switzerland and Tatyana McFadden of the United States have the most victories, with five each. McFadden also holds the women's course record with a time of 1:43:04 set in 2015, while Kurt Fearnley of Australia holds the men's record with 1:29:22 set in 2006.

Winners

Men's open division

Women's open division

Men's wheelchair division

Women's wheelchair division

Victories by nationality

Notes and references

Notes

Citations

Sources
 
 

New York

New York City-related lists